Alexis Salatko (Alexis Wladimir Marie Salatko-Petryszcze) (born 1 January 1959 in Suresnes) is a French writer of Ukrainian origin.

Works 
1981: Le Tigre d'écume, Paris, Éditions Gallimard, Collection Blanche, 289 p. 
1984: Le Couturier de Zviska , Paris, series "Romans", 183 p. 
1987: S'il pleut, il pleuvra, Presses de la Renaissance, 200 p. 
1988: Rêves d'escales, escales de rêve followed by Sur les rails, été 1921, Cherbourg-Octeville, Éditions Isoète, series "Rivages d'encre", 175 p. 
1990:  Vingt-deux nuances de gris, Presses de la Renaissance, series "Les Nouvelles françaises", 184 p. 
1993: Bill et Bela, Presses de la Renaissance, series "Les romans français", 166 p. 
 - bourse Thyde Monnier 1993
1995: Notre-Dame des Queens, phot. by Guillaume Brown, hist. of Jean-Louis Libourel and Marie-Hélène Renou-Enault, Cherbourg-Octeville, Éditions Isoète, 85 p. 
2000: Mauve Haviland, Paris, Éditions du Seuil, series "Roman français", 384 p. 
2002: Tube..., Cherbourg-Octeville, France, Éditions Isoète, 62 p. 
2003: La fille qui hurle sur l'affiche, Gallimard, Collection Blanche, 139 p. 
2004: Milledgeville, sanctuaire des oiseaux et des fous. Flannery O'Connor, un autoportrait, Paris, Éditions Fayard, 215 p.  
2005: Horowitz et mon père, Fayard, 187 p. 
2006: - prix Jean-Freustié 2006
 - prix littéraire du Cotentin 2006
2006! Un fauteuil au bord du vide, Fayard, 207 p. .
 - prix François Mauriac of the Académie française 2007 - bronze medal.
2007: China et la grande fabrique, Fayard, 385 p. .
2011: Celine's band, Paris, Éditions Robert Laffont, 201 p. 
2012: Le Parieur, Fayard, 262 p. 
2013: Folles de Django, Robert Laffont, 276 p.

References

External links 
 Le mentir vrai d’Alexis Salatko on Linternaute
 Alexis Salatko on France Inter
 Alexis Salatko on Babelio
 Alexis Salatko on France Culture

20th-century French novelists
21st-century French novelists
Prix Jean Freustié winners
People from Suresnes
1959 births
Living people